Narmin Bayramova (born 03 December 2005) is an Azerbaijani rhythmic gymnast. She represent her country in international competitions.

Career 
Narmin won gold at both Baku Championships and Azerbaijan Championships in 2017. The following year she won silver at the "Irina Cup" in Warsaw.

In 2020 she was selected to participate in the 2020 European Championships in Kyiv along Alina Gozalova, Leyli Aghazada, Ilona Zeynalova and the senior group, ending 10th with rope and 6th with ribbon also achieving the bronze medal in the team category.

In 2021 she debuted as a senior, taking part in the World Championships along Zohra Aghamirova, Arzu Jalilova and the senior group, competing with ribbon Bayramova took 41st place with the apparatus.

Routine music information

References 

2005 births
Living people
Azerbaijani rhythmic gymnasts
Medalists at the Rhythmic Gymnastics European Championships
21st-century Azerbaijani women